Landmark is a commercial complex owned by Hongkong Land in Central, Hong Kong. It consists of three office towers: Gloucester Tower, Edinburgh Tower and York House. Its retail podium, Landmark Atrium, forms the core component of the LANDMARK shopping mall.

The Landmark Mandarin Oriental Hotel is in the lower floors of Edinburgh Tower, directly linked to the retail floors of Landmark Atrium.

History
It is partly built on the site of the former Hong Kong Hotel, which was in its day the best known hotel on Hong Kong Island. In the 1970s, Hongkong Land started the development of the Landmark under its Central Redevelopment Scheme. The first phase of the project was completed in the late 1970s and the whole project was completed in 1983.

When the development was completed in 1983, the development consisted of a series of levels of shops surrounding a large central atrium with two office towers on top, known as Edinburgh Tower and Gloucester Tower respectively, and an annex building, known as the Landmark East. 

In 2003, Part of Edinburgh Tower was converted into The Landmark Mandarin Oriental Hotel, a boutique hotel.

Recent development

In 2002, Hongkong Land announced a 1 billion dollar plan - The Landmark Scheme - to renovate The Landmark. The whole scheme included extending the existing shopping atrium to 3/F and 4/F of the building, introducing a department store Harvey Nichols and a hotel The Landmark Mandarin Oriental Hotel, and the redevelopment of The Landmark East into a new 14-floor office tower named York House. The scheme was completed in October 2006 with the opening of York House. To expand and upgrade the Landmark's retail offerings, architects Aedas and Kohn Pedersen Fox carved out areas in the existing retail atrium for several two-story flagship stores and added two new retail floors. A wall of folded glass panels envelopes the retail podium.

In early 2012, Hongkong Land launched a new brand "LANDMARK" for its retail portfolio in Central, covering its four interconnected shopping arcades at The Landmark, Alexandra House, Chater House and Prince's Building. The retail complex of the Landmark was subsequently branded as LANDMARK ATRIUM. At the same time, The Landmark (the complex) itself was renamed as Landmark.

Notable tenants 
Landmark is home to many leading law firms and barristers' chambers:

 Skadden, Arps, Slate, Meagher & Flom LLP and Affiliates (42/F Edinburgh Tower)
Han Kun Law Offices (39/F Edinburgh Tower)
Goodwin Procter (38/F Edinburgh Tower)
 Gibson, Dunn & Crutcher LLP (32/F Gloucester Tower)
 Jones Day (31/F Edinburgh Tower)
 Squire Patton Boggs (29/F Edinburgh Tower)
 Kirkland & Ellis LLP (26/F Gloucester Tower)
 Herbert Smith Freehills (23/F Gloucester Tower)
 Withers LLP (20/F Gloucester Tower)
Akin Gump Strauss Hauer & Feld LLP (18/F Gloucester Tower)
 Morgan, Lewis & Bockius LLP (19/F Edinburgh Tower)
 DLA Piper (17/F Edinburgh Tower)
 King & Wood Mallesons (13/F Gloucester Tower)
 Shearman & Sterling LLP (12/F Gloucester Tower)
 Nord Anglia Education (18/F Edinburgh Tower)

See also
 Hongkong Land
 Alexandra House
 Prince's Building
 Chater House
 L'Atelier de Joël Robuchon (Hong Kong)

References

External links

 
 The public announcement by Hongkong Land on The Landmark Scheme

Skyscraper office buildings in Hong Kong
Central, Hong Kong
Shopping centres in Hong Kong
Hongkong Land
Mandarin Oriental Hotel Group